Lipovo Polje is a village in Perušić municipality, Croatia. The population in 2011 was 122.

References

Populated places in Lika-Senj County